Beatrice Cedermark (born 12 February 1993) is a Swedish tennis player.

Cedermark won one doubles title on the ITF tour in her career. On 13 August 2012, she reached her best singles ranking of world number 612. On 11 June 2012, she peaked at world number 716 in the doubles rankings.

Cedermark made her WTA tour debut at the 2012 Swedish Open, partnering Rebecca Peterson in doubles.

ITF finals (1–3)

Singles (0–2)

Doubles (1–1)

References

External links 
 
 

1993 births
Living people
Swedish female tennis players
20th-century Swedish women
21st-century Swedish women